Kedi Billa Killadi Ranga is a 2013 Tamil-language political comedy drama film written, directed and co-produced by Pandiraj. It features Sivakarthikeyan and Vimal in lead roles, alongside Bindu Madhavi and Regina Cassandra. Yuvan Shankar Raja composed the soundtrack. The film released on 29 March 2013 and received positive responses from critics as well as audiences. It ran for 100 days in many theatres in Tamil Nadu and was commercially successful. The film was remade in Kannada as Katte.

Plot
The film opens with two friends "Billa Kesavan" aka "Theni" Kesavan (Vimal) and "Ranga Murugan" aka "Pattai" Murugan (Sivakarthikeyan), who are unemployed and want to become politicians. Meanwhile, Murugan meets Parvathy aka Paapaa (Regina Cassandra) and falls for her. On the other side, Kesavan meets Mithra Meenalochini (Bindu Madhavi) and falls for her. Paappaa and Mithra too fall for them after many confusions. There comes the Councilor Election, and Murugan stands for it. Paappaa gives Murugan money to spend for the election. Eventually, Murugan loses in the election. Seeing this, his father Aachivardham (Manoj Kumar) dies by falling off of the train platform. Due to this, Murugan gets his father's job. In the meantime, Kesavan marries Mithra. Murugan and Paappaa wait for the acceptance of their parents. Their parents accept for their marriage, and they get married. Soon, Murugan and Kesavan realise the real value of the life, and they decide that life is nothing without doing work, so they both go to their respective homes. While seeing their fathers' photos, Murugan and Kesavan write "DAD IS MY GOD" and "MY FATHER IS HERO" respectively.

Cast

 Sivakarthikeyan as Pattai Murugan / Ranga Murugan
 Vimal as Theni Kesavan / Billa Kesavan
 Bindu Madhavi as Mithra Meenalochini
 Regina Cassandra as Parvathy (Paapaa)
 Soori as Sindru
 Delhi Ganesh as Chidambaram
 Manoj Kumar as Aachivardham
 Sujatha Sivakumar as Murugan's mother
 Nadodigal Gopal as Mithra's father
 Namo Narayana
 Myna Nandhini as Sindru's wife
 Vazhakku En Muthuraman as Sindru's uncle
 Goutham Purusoth

Production
After Marina, Pandiraj announced his next project Kedi Billa Killadi Ranga with Vimal and Sivakarthikeyan two of his proteges in lead roles. The director noted that he was initially interested in also casting Arulnithi, another protege, in a third leading role, but was unable due to the script. Bindhu Madhavi was selected as first heroine while Regina Cassandra who earlier appeared in Kanda Naal Mudhal and Azhagiya Asura was selected as second heroine.

The film is all set shooting in Trichirapalli around the areas of Ponmalai(Golden Rock), Subramaniyapuram, Jamal Mohamed College, Lakshmi Nivas Hotel, Places near Rathna Stores Firm, Kattur, Jai Nagar, Malaikovil, Frontline Hospital and Thiruverumbur. The makers of the film initially wanted Silambarasan and Dhanush to sing the song "Oru Porumbokku", but Dhanush's involvement in foreign shooting for Maryan, meant that Yuvan Shankar Raja ended up singing the song.

Marketing
Teaser of the film was released on 11 Jan 2013 along with Studio Green's Karthi Pongal mass masala Alex Pandian. Venkat Prabhu, Premgi Amaren and VTV Ganesh were roped in for a promotional video, in addition to the film's cast. It was launched on the net and television before the film's theatrical release.

Soundtrack

Yuvan Shankar Raja composed the soundtrack for Kedi Billa Killadi Ranga, working the first time with director Pandiraj. The audio of the film was to be launched on 6 February 2013 at the Satyam Cinemas in Chennai, but had been cancelled, owing to the case filed by R Jayaraman of RS Infotainment against P Madan the co-producer of Kedi Billa Killadi Ranga. The director revealed that he had initially planned for four songs, but decided to add one more track at the last minute. Silambarasan has sung the opening song of the film with Yuvan.The soundtrack received positive reviews from the critics.

Release
K.E. Gnanavel Raja's Studio Green secured the distribution rights for Kedi Billa Killadi Ranga in November 2012. The satellite rights of the film were purchased by Zee Thamizh. The film was released on 29 March 2013 for the Easter weekend along with three other film, Chennaiyil Oru Naal, Azhagan Azhagi and Keeripulla. It was Released in 332 Screens. The film was also dubbed and released in Hindi as Sabse Bada Zero 2 in 2020.

Reception
KBKR opened to positive reviews. in.com rated it 3 out of 5 and stated that Pandiraj got his casting right and rides on them without worrying much about the plot. The film works in bits and pieces. Go for it only if you have nothing better to do!. Behindwoods gave the movie 3 out of 5 and stated that it was an enjoyable funny ride for summer.
Shailesh K Nadar of CinemaSpice.in rated the movie as 3.5/5 and mentioned in his review that "Though KBKR isn’t content rich like the director’s debut Pasanga, it is undeniably a family entertainer this summer!". Rediff wrote:"Director Pandiraj injects a good dose of humour and makes the film enjoyable to watch". Times of India said, "By now, the tale of a wastrel turning responsible has been done to death in Tamil cinema but what sets this film apart is in the refreshingly effortless manner in which the director spins his tale." Baradwaj Rangan of the Hindu wrote "Let’s not get into the depressing aspect of youths opting to stand in elections simply because it’s an easy career opportunity, apparently requiring no real skills – this is supposed to be a comedy, after all. But it’s galling, in a movie that’s content to milk laughs from a hero’s bleeding bum, when we’re fed messages about our youngsters entering politics (new blood and all that) and leading useful lives."

References

External links
 

2013 films
Indian romantic comedy-drama films
2013 romantic comedy-drama films
Films shot in Tiruchirappalli
Films scored by Yuvan Shankar Raja
Tamil films remade in other languages
2010s Tamil-language films
Films directed by Pandiraj
Films set in Tiruchirappalli
2013 comedy films
2013 drama films